Mion may refer to:

People
 Alain Mion, French pianist and singer
 Charles-Louis Mion (1699–1775), French composer
 Frédéric Mion, French civil servant
 Giuseppe Mion, Austrian ice hockey player
 Jérémie Mion, French competitive sailor
 Luigi Mion, Italian painter
 Marcos Mion, Brazilian TV host and actor
 Mion Mukaichi (born 1998), Japanese singer 
 Tina Mion, American contemporary artist

Other
 Mion, Budaun, a block and village panchayat in Uttar Pradesh, India
 Mion District, one of the 26 districts in the Northern Region of Ghana
 Mion (Ghana parliament constituency)